Fingers That Kill (Tie zhi tang shou)  is a 1972 Hong Kong film directed by Hui Kwok.

Cast
Thompson Kao Kang
Tony Liu Jun Guk
Jason Pai Piao
Chan Lau
Ang Saan
Tong Kwok Si
Ma Chung Tak
Lau Hok Nin

References

1972 films
Hong Kong martial arts films
1970s action films
1970s Mandarin-language films
1970s Hong Kong films